Ron Sparks may refer to:
 Ron Sparks (comedian) (born 1977), Canadian comedian, actor and writer
 Ron Sparks (politician) (born 1952), American politician
 Ron Sparks (fighter) (born 1974), American mixed martial artist
 Ron E Sparks, Australian radio personality

See also
 Ron Mael (born 1945), member of the band Sparks